Maria "Magalì" Vettorazzo (16 March 1942 – 18 June 2018) was an Italian female pentathlete who won a bronze medal at the 1967 Mediterranean Games in 100 metres hurdles.

Biography
She has 32 caps, from 1960 t 1971, in the Italy national athletics team and She was the first Italian woman of the history to jump over 6 metres in long jump. She competed at the 1968 Olympics and finished in 21st place. She also participated at three editions of the European Athletics Championships.

National titles
She won 18 national championships at individual senior level.

 Italian Athletics Championships
 80 metres hurdles: 1965, 1966, 1967 (3)
 100 metres hurdles: 1969 (1)
 Long jump: 1961, 1962, 1963, 1964, 1966, 1967, 1969 (7)
 Pentathlon: 1962, 1963, 1965, 1966, 1967, 1969, 1970 (7)

See also
 Italian record progression women's long jump
 Italian Athletics Championships - Multi winners

References

External links
 

1942 births
2018 deaths
Italian female pentathletes
Italian female long jumpers
Italian female hurdlers
Olympic athletes of Italy
Athletes (track and field) at the 1968 Summer Olympics
Mediterranean Games bronze medalists for Italy
Athletes (track and field) at the 1967 Mediterranean Games
Mediterranean Games medalists in athletics
Italian Athletics Championships winners
Sportspeople from the Province of Treviso
20th-century Italian women